A tailor is a person who makes, repairs, or alters clothing professionally.

Tailor may also refer to:

 Bluefish (Pomatomus saltatrix), also known as tailors
The Tailor, or Scissorman, a bogeyman character from Heinrich Hoffman's Struwwelpeter
The Tailor (Moroni), a painting by Giovanni Battista Moroni; late Renaissance period
 The Tailor (film), a 2017 Vietnamese drama film

See also 
 Taylor (disambiguation)